Ip Man 4: The Finale is a 2019 martial arts film directed by Wilson Yip and produced by Raymond Wong. It is the fourth and final film in the Ip Man film series, which is loosely based on the life of the Wing Chun grandmaster of the same name, and features Donnie Yen in the title role.

A co-production of Hong Kong and China, the film began production in April 2018 and ended in July of the same year. It was released on 20 December 2019.

Plot 
In 1964, Ip Man is diagnosed with throat cancer due to his history of chronic smoking. After his rebellious son Ip Ching fights back against a bully and is subsequently expelled from school, Ip Man decides to travel to San Francisco in order to look for study opportunities. After Ching and his father get into a heated argument that ends with the elder Ip slapping his son, he decides to entrust Ching to his friend, Fat Bo.

Ip arrives in San Francisco, where his student Bruce Lee has upset the local martial arts community by opening a kung fu school, teaching non-Chinese people martial arts, and writing an English-language book on martial arts. He discovers from his reporter friend Liang Gen that, because he is a foreigner, a referral letter from the Chinese Consolidated Benevolent Association is needed to enroll Ching into an American school. Tai Chi master/CBA chairman Wan Zhoungwa refuses to write the letter as Ip is unbothered by Lee's actions, whereas the other grandmasters display open contempt.

While leaving the school after a meeting with the principal, Ip sees upon Wan's teenage daughter, Yonah, undergoing a racist attack from a rival cheerleader, Becky, and her male friends. Ip steps in to rescue her and escorts Yonah home, where Wan is upset that she got into a fight. Ip steps in by telling Wan that Yonah wasn't wrong to defend herself. Wan then explains to Ip that, because he's a foreigner, he doesn't understand that the whites in his country love harassing Chinese. Just before Ip leaves, Wan blames him for using his daughter merely to get the letter and challenges him to a fight for it. The duel is interrupted by an earthquake, and Wan tells Ip they will finish it at the upcoming Mid-Autumn Festival. Ip refuses, explaining that he merely accompanied Yonah home for her own safety, and leaves.

Meanwhile, Becky lies to her parents, claiming that Yonah attacked her. Her father, Andrew Walters, an officer of the INS, is pressured by his wife into holding the Association responsible and deporting all illegal immigrants associated with them. Elsewhere, Hartman Wu, a staff sergeant in the US Marines and student of Lee, attempts to convince Barton Geddes, the Gunnery Sergeant on his base, to incorporate Chinese martial arts into their hand-to-hand combat training, especially Wing Chun, which is useful in close quarters. Geddes, an open racist, seemingly proves the Marines' current karate program superior by having Hartman fight the Marines' karate instructor, Colin Frater, with Frater easily beating Hartman.

However, Hartman manages to convince the unit's commanding officer of kung fu's potential use, and is permitted to film the Mid-Autumn Festival happening at Chinatown for research purposes, infuriating Geddes, who instructs Frater to challenge the grandmasters at the festival. Frater easily defeats 3 of the grandmasters before Ip intervenes and beats him badly. Meanwhile, Wan, who was supposed to be present at the festival, is arrested by the INS. Upon seeing Frater in the hospital, Geddes barges into the CBA, and uses his strength and karate prowess to brutally defeat all the grandmasters present. He then threatens Walters into releasing Wan into Marine custody before bringing Wan into the camp to fight him. Due to a tip-off by a subordinate of Walter and another student of Lee named Billy, Ip and Gen help the Association evacuate by the time the INS conducts its raid. Lee provides refuge for the Association, earning their respect.

Wan and Geddes arrive at the camp and duel. Wan is able to match Geddes at first, but is eventually overwhelmed and seriously injured. Wan is taken to the hospital, where an emotional Ip calls Fat Bo to reveal that he has cancer. Fat Bo angrily tells Ip Ching to talk to his father, after many previous refusals. The older Ip apologizes to his son for slapping him during their argument, and promises to teach his son kung fu when he comes back to Hong Kong. Hartman brings Ip to the Marines, and he triumphantly defeats the Gunnery Sergeant after a tough fight.

Wan prepares the referral letter for Ip, but Ip turns it down, having decided against moving to America. Ip returns to Hong Kong and accepts the fact that Ching likes martial arts. A weary but determined Ip instructs his son to film him as he demonstrates Wing Chun on a wooden dummy.

An epilogue shows Lee paying respect to Ip at his funeral. Onscreen text states that Ip succumbed to his cancer in 1972 at the age of 79 and that the Marines officially incorporated Chinese martial arts into their training by inviting Chinese martial artists to come to the base to train them starting in 2001.

Cast 
 Donnie Yen as Ip Man, an unassuming Chinese Wing Chun master originally from Foshan.
 Wu Yue as Wan Zonghua, chairman of the Chinese Benevolent Association (CBA) and Master of Tai Chi.
 Vanness Wu (credited simply as "Van Ness") as Hartman Wu, US Marines Corps staff sergeant and Bruce Lee's student.
 Scott Adkins as Barton Geddes, a corrupt, racist US Marines Corps gunnery sergeant and Karate expert.
 Kent Cheng as Fat Bo, a friend of Ip Man.
 Danny Chan as Bruce Lee, owner of a San Francisco martial arts school and Ip Man's student.
 Simon Shiyamba as Billy, a black INS officer and Bruce Lee's student.
 Ngo Ka-nin as Liang Gen, friend of Ip Man and reporter.
 Chris Collins as Colin Frater, a racist US Marine Corps Karate Sensei.
 Vanda Margraf as Yonah Wan, daughter of Wan Zonghua.
 Ye He as Ip Ching, Ip Man's second son.
 Lo Mang as Law Chun-ting, friend of Ip Man and Master of Monkey Kung Fu.
 Grace Englert as Becky Walters, Andrew and Gabrielle's daughter who racially bullies Yonah.
 Andrew Lane as Andrew Walters, a corrupt and racist INS officer, Becky's father and Gabrielle's husband.
 Nicola Stuard Hill as Gabrielle Walters, Becky's mother and Andrew's wife.
 Linda Jean Barry as School principal.
 Mark Strange as Karate champion
 Dbo Funds as Rapper

In addition, several actors appear in cameos as characters from the previous films in a flashback sequence via archive footage, including Lynn Hung as Cheung Wing-sing, Ip Man's deceased wife; Gordon Lam as Li Chiu, a police officer from Foshan; Huang Xiaoming as Wong Leung, Ip Man's first student; Sammo Hung as the late Hung Chun-nam, an asthmatic Hung Ga master; Mike Tyson as Frank, an American property developer; Sarut Khanwilai as Suchart, a Thai Boxer; Zhang Jin as Cheung Tin-chi, a Wing Chun master who was defeated by Ip Man in a duel; the late Darren Shahlavi as Taylor "The Twister" Miller, an English boxing champion who was defeated by Ip Man; and Simon Yam as Chow Ching-chuen, Ip Man's old friend.

Production 
On 30 September 2016, Donnie Yen (who portrayed the Wing Chun grandmaster Ip Man in three films) announced that he and series director Wilson Yip would return for the fourth film in the series. Writer Edmond Wong also returned. Producer Raymond Wong said he paid Yen "a hefty amount of money" to return for the fourth film. Principal photography began in April 2018, and ended that July. Filming locations included China, Pensby High School, Crosby Beach and Preston, Lancashire. In September 2019, Donnie Yen said Ip Man 4 would be the last film in the series.

Release 
Ip Man 4: The Finale was released on December 20, 2019. The film had a limited release on December 25, 2019, in the United States distributed by Well Go USA. It was released by CMC Pictures in Australia and New Zealand on 20 December 2019.

Reception 
The site's critics consensus reads, "Packed with action and featuring some of Donnie Yen's finest fighting, Ip Man 4: The Finale serves as a satisfying rebound – and fitting finale – for the franchise." On Metacritic, the film has a weighted average score of 62 out of 100 based on 11 critics, indicating "generally favorable reviews."

According to the Malaysian newspaper The Star, the movie was the highest grossing Chinese film of all time in the country while according to Shine.cn, the movie was the third highest grossing Chinese film in North America in five years.

As of March 2020, the film has grossed over $239 million worldwide, Taiwan box office is NT$185 million (US6.15 million), As of Jan 5, Singapore box office is US$6.74, Malaysia box office over RM 36 million (US8.6 million), making over $197.2 million in Mainland China.

Controversy
During the 2019 Hong Kong protests, protesters urged a boycott of the film, citing the pro-Beijing stances of actors Donnie Yen and Danny Chan and producer Raymond Wong. Protesters actively spoiled the film on social media in both English and Chinese.

See also
Donnie Yen filmography
List of films featuring Wing Chun

References

External links 
 

2010s biographical films
2019 films
2019 martial arts films
2010s Cantonese-language films
Cultural depictions of Bruce Lee
Depictions of Ip Man on film
2010s English-language films
Films about cancer
Films about racism
Films about the United States Marine Corps
Films directed by Wilson Yip
Films scored by Kenji Kawai
Films set in 1964
Films set in Hong Kong
Films set in San Francisco
Hong Kong biographical films
Hong Kong sequel films
Kung fu films
Wushu films
2019 action drama films
2019 multilingual films
Hong Kong multilingual films
2010s Hong Kong films
Foreign films set in the United States